A Little Worm is a 1995 short film directed by Marc Benardout.  It stars  Vincent Riotta and Issy Van Randwyck.   The short film was distributed theatrically by Buena Vista with the feature film Ed Wood by director Tim Burton.
It was shown on television  by Channel 4 on their series "The Shooting  Gallery".

Plot
In 1929, in Chicago, 12-year-old Larry Adler was heralded as a prodigy of the harmonica.  Having left home for a life on the road and stage, Adler tagged along with his musical buddies to a party thrown at the apartment of underworld leader Al Capone.

When Capone spies the Young upstart he chastises him for turning up uninvited in front of all of his guests. In a moment of raw nerves, young Larry is unfazed and as a result, Capone's temper is thwarted and he rewards the boy with a drink at his table and an anecdote of jury bribery that went south. Unfortunately, this was a little above young Larry's head but he lived to tell the tale and won kudos from his peers.

Festivals
Sinner was chosen as an official selection in the   Barcelona Film Festival, Hamptons Film Festival, Houston Worldfest, New York Albany Film Festival, Cork Film Festival, British Short Film Festival, Wrexham Film Festival (Wales), Huy Film Festival (Belgium), and Kino Film Festival.

Awards
 Best Film, 1995 Barcelona Film Festival
 Best Cinematography, 1995 Barcelona Film Festival
 Best Actor, 1995 Barcelona Film Festival
 2nd Place, 1995 Huy Film Festival, Belgium
 4th Place, 1995 Houston Worldfest

External links
Director official site

1995 films
1995 drama films
1995 short films
British independent films
British drama short films
British black-and-white films
1990s English-language films
1990s British films